Kerling may refer to:

Kerling, Selangor, a town in the state of Selangor in Malaysia.
Kerling (Iceland), a mountain in Iceland.
Kerling-lès-Sierck, a commune in the Moselle department in France.
 Kerling, a female giant in Icelandic myth, associated with the island of Drangey